Sarah Natochenny (born September 20, 1987) is an American voice actress and film editor. She is best known for voicing Ash Ketchum and various other characters in the English dub of Pokémon since 2006, as well as Alicia in the 2006 video game Bullet Witch. She has also edited documentaries for networks such as MSNBC and worked as an assistant editor on the films Life of Crime, Cold Comes the Night, Worst Friends, and Cruise.

Early life
Natochenny was born in the Forest Hills neighborhood of New York City's Queens borough. When she was 12, she participated in the Junior Olympics, where she won a bronze medal in rhythmic gymnastics. She graduated from Brooklyn Technical High School in 2005. She went on to study at the Lee Strasberg Theatre Institute's Young Actors Program, as well as the Upright Citizens Brigade and Magnet Theatre in New York City.

Career
At the age of 18, Natochenny replaced Veronica Taylor as the voice of Ash Ketchum on the English-language dub of Pokémon, starting with the show's ninth season in 2006. She likened getting the role to "being struck by Pikachu’s Thunderbolt", stating: "Booking the job was the most exciting moment of my life." She also voices various other characters on the show. She voiced Alicia in the 2006 video game Bullet Witch.

In 2009, Natochenny appeared in videos on the comedy website CollegeHumor.

In 2019, Natochenny won the Outstanding Animation or Gaming - Demo, Best Voiceover award from the Society of Voice Arts and Sciences.

In 2020, Natochenny co-starred in the live action pilot "I Adore Dolores," which was one of No Budge's top picks of the year. She also appeared in three videos for Vanity Fair, talking about the dubbing process and improvising as never-before-seen characters.

Natochenny has appeared on multiple episodes of The George Lucas Talk Show, including The George Lucas Talk Show All Day Star Wars Movie Watch Along, May the AR Be LIKE$$ You, and The George Lucas Holiday Special.

Natochenny is also a film editor, having worked as the primary editor on documentaries for networks such as MSNBC and an assistant editor on the films Life of Crime, Cold Comes the Night, Worst Friends, and Cruise.

Personal life
Natochenny splits her time between Los Angeles and New York City. She has been open about her struggles with depression. Natochenny is of Russian descent and speaks fluent Russian in addition to English.

Inspired by a Pokémon episode that dealt with death, Natochenny and fellow voice actress Lisa Ortiz co-founded Voices for Fosters, a charity dedicated to helping rescued animals find permanent homes and advising people on how to foster them. Their website states, "Our goal is to bring the joy of pet companionship to people who didn't think they had the time, end euthanasia and improve care standards for all animals."

Filmography

Anime

Animation

Film

Video games

References

External links
 
 
 
 Sarah Natochenny at Crystal Acids the English Voice Actor & Production Staff Database

1987 births
Actresses from New York City
American child actresses
American female models
American people of Russian descent
American video game actresses
American voice actresses
CollegeHumor people
Lee Strasberg Theatre and Film Institute alumni
Living people
Pokémon